The Forest Preserve District of Will County was created by referendum on July 25, 1927, to preserve open spaces in Will County, Illinois, US. The first land acquisition was in 1930. , the District owns or manages  of land. Current Will County board members make up a board of commissioners, which oversees the affairs of the Forest Preserve District.

Forest and nature preserves

The Forest Preserve District of Will County owns or manages land in 70 forest preserves, including 10 designated as Illinois Nature Preserves for their rare natural features. Many preserves offer amenities such as picnic shelters, campsites, canoe/kayak/boat launches, fishing access, ice skating ponds, playgrounds, and sled hills. The Forest Preserve District also operates three off-leash dog parks, which require a permit for use.

Nature preserves are not the only protected areas in Will County. Channahon State Park and Midewin National Tallgrass Prairie are examples of state and federal parks, respectively. Channahon lies along the Illinois and Michigan Canal and is connected to the county and national trails in the area. Midewin National Tallgrass Prairie is located near Elwood, Illinois.

Trails

Many of the trails are part of regional trail systems, such as the Grand Illinois Trail and the American Discovery Trail.

Visitor centers

The district's visitor centers provide information regarding historical sites and natural settings along with environmental education. The visitor centers each provide unique services and have varying hours of operation. Seven visitor centers are located throughout Will County: 

Four Rivers Environmental Education Center, McKinley Woods - Kerry Sheridan Grove, Channahon
Isle a la Cache Museum, Romeoville
Lake Renwick Heron Rookery Visitor Center, Plainfield
Monee Reservoir, Monee
Plum Creek Nature Center at Goodenow Grove Nature Preserve, Beecher
Sugar Creek Administration Center, Sugar Creek Preserve, Joliet

Conservation and land management

In 2010, Will County's population was 677,560, 35% higher than in 2000, making it one of the nation's fastest-growing counties. As the population increases, there is a decrease in available land for open space. To preserve the limited open space, the Forest Preserve District of Will County acquires land through property sales, donations, and leases.

Once property is acquired, the Forest Preserve District implements its Land Management Program. The program involves protection, maintenance, restoration, or reconstruction of native ecosystems to preserve the diversity of native flora and fauna. This is accomplished through removal of invasive plant species, installation of native plant species, controlled burns, and other activities.

Events and programming

Each year, family friendly special events are hosted by the Forest Preserve District of Will County. These events range from bike rides to festivals that are attended by thousands of people. 

Smaller, more frequent programming offered by the Forest Preserve District provides individuals and families opportunities to learn and experience new things year-round. Learning to kayak, bird watching with a naturalist, and talking to an historical re-enactor are some of the programs that are typically offered. 

The Forest Preserve District also offers environmental, historical, and cultural education programs for students in the classroom and at visitor centers throughout Will County as well as programming for youth groups.

See also
Thorn Creek Nature Center and Preserve

References

External links
Official Website

Nature reserves in Illinois
Protected areas of Will County, Illinois
1927 establishments in Illinois